General Godwin was a convict ship that transported fifteen convicts from Calcutta, India to Fremantle, Western Australia in 1854. It arrived in Fremantle on 28 March 1854.  The fifteen convicts were all soldiers who had been convicted by court-martial and sentenced to transportation.  In addition to the convicts, there were thirteen passengers on board.

List of convicts on the General Godwin

See also
List of convict ship voyages to Western Australia
Convict era of Western Australia

References

Convict ships to Western Australia